Geronimo Meynier (5 July 1941 – 23 January 2021) was an Italian film actor who starred in Italian cinema of the 1950s and 1960s. He debuted in Amici per la pelle in 1955 at age 14. His last film was in 1968.

The Italian actor Geronimo Meynier shone in the mid-fifties of the 20th century as a child star, his filmography stopped at eighteen films, but he lives in private for almost half a century. He was born during the Second World War in the port of Fiume, which today bears the name Rijeka and is located in Croatia, but then it belonged to Italy. Geronimo came from a well-to-do family, his grandfather founded a large paper factory in Fiume, his ancestors were from France, which is also indicated by the surname. Rijeka was annexed to Yugoslavia after the war, but the Meynier family fled from communist partisans in 1943 due to their belonging to a higher social class.

Geronimo spent part of his childhood in a boys' boarding school in Austria, in 1954 he returned to his parents in Italy. Shortly thereafter, he auditioned for the upcoming film directed by Franco Rossi, BEST FRIENDS (Amici per la pelle, 1955). He already impressed the jury by the fact that, unlike the other three hundred boys, he came to the audition without his parents. Finally, he was chosen and his father then signed a contract with the film company Cinecittà, which guaranteed Geronimo an income of ten times the average salary at the time. The film BEST FRIENDS, about the friendship of two teenagers from different social strata, attracted the attention of experts in particular, triumphed at the Venice festival and won a trophy at the awards given by the Italian Syndicate of Film Journalists.

Even though the fourteen-year-old Geronimo Meynier became a well-paid celebrity in the mid-1950s, he retained his boyish immediacy, which is evidenced, among other things, by the note mentioned in the biographies about his arrival at the festival in Venice on a second-class train. With his sympathetic face and natural acting, he also appealed to other filmmakers and became the cast representative of teenage boys. He got a minor role in the film GUENDALINA (1957) directed by Alberto Lattuada, then he got a bigger opportunity in the romantic comedy LOVE AND GOSSIP (Amore e chiacchiere, 1958) directed by Alessandro Blasetti, in which his father was the famous Vittorio de Sica.

As an eighteen-year-old, Meynier starred in six films in 1959, the most successful domestic title being the World War I comedy THE GREAT WAR (La grande guerra, 1959), where, however, he flashed only in a minor role as a messenger. On the contrary, he played big roles again in mediocre comedies of that time (PRVNÍ LÁSKA - Primo amore, 1959; WINTER HOLIDAYS - Vacanze d'inverno, 1959). He got even bigger opportunities in extremely successful comedies alongside the famous comedian Totò (TOTÒ, FABRIZI AND THE YOUTH OF TODAY – Totò, Fabrizi e giovanni d'oggi, 1960; TOTÒTRUFFA, 1962).

Meynier's filmography closes with the title role of Romeo in the adaptation of Shakespeare's classic drama ROMEO AND JULIE (Giulietta e Romeo, 1964) directed by Riccardo Freda. Although this film went through Italian cinemas without much interest, it was a great success, for example, in Japan, where Geronimo received thousands of letters from female admirers. However, Geronimo Meynier resigned to another film career; the reason was not only the general crisis of Italian cinematography, but also the problematic transformation of child actors into male roles.

Geronimo Meynier has lived in Milan since the mid-1960s, where he worked for a long time in the automotive industry (his love for technical fields has accompanied him since childhood). He has three children with his wife Monica

Selected filmography
 1955 : Amici per la pelle
 1958 : Amore e chiacchiere
 1959 : La cento chilometri
 1959 : Vacanze d'inverno  
 1959 : First Love 
 1960 : Toto, Fabrizi and the Young People Today
 1961 : Totòtruffa 62
 1962 : Love at Twenty
 1964 : Romeo and Juliet (1964 film)
 1968 : Totò Story

References

External links
 

1941 births
2021 deaths
Italian male film actors
Italian male child actors